Chirag Kumar Paswan (born 31 October 1982) is an Indian politician, former actor and president of the Lok Janshakti Party (Ram Vilas). He is the son of late Member of Parliament and Union Minister, Ram Vilas Paswan.

Early life and acting career 

His father, a Bihari, married his mother Reena Sharma, a Punjabi Hindu air hostess from Amritsar, in 1983.

Paswan is a 3rd Semester college dropout (in Computer Engineering degree). After dropping out from college, he starred opposite Kangana Ranaut in a Hindi movie Miley Naa Miley Hum (2011).

Political career 

Subsequently, Paswan contested the 2014 elections for the Lok Janshakti Party in the seat of Jamui. He won the seat, defeating the nearest rival Sudhansu Shekhar Bhaskar of Rashtriya Janata Dal by over 85,000 votes. Paswan retained his seat in the 2019 elections, securing a total of 528,771 votes and defeating nearest rival Bhudeo Choudhary.

Paswan also owns a NGO named Chirag Ka Rojgar, a foundation to provide jobs to the unemployed youths of his state.

Paswan was elected as member of the 16th Lok Sabha in the 2014 Indian general election from Jamui constituency in Bihar, while his father won from Hajipur constituency both through Lok Janshakti Party.

Ahead of the upcoming Bihar Assembly Elections 2020, Chirag Paswan launched Bihar First, Bihari First campaign drawing attention of the youth of Bihar. Bihar First, Bihari First campaign aims at developing the state of Bihar thoroughly. Paswan also added that there is an utmost requirement to make Bihar a 'number one' State.

On 27 February  2021, Paswan donated  lakh for the construction of the Ram Mandir in Ayodhya, and said it is the duty of everyone belonging to the deprived section of society to pitch in this regard.

On 14 June 2021, Chirag was replaced as Lok Sabha leader of the LJP by his uncle Pashupati Kumar Paras.
A day after, Chirag expelled 5 rebel MP's for anti-party activities including his uncle Pashupati Kumar Paras and cousin Prince Raj.

Electoral performance

Filmography
 2011 Miley Naa Miley Hum

Awards

Notes

References

External links
Official biographical sketch in Parliament of India website

Lok Janshakti Party politicians
Presidents of the Lok Janshakti Party
Living people
India MPs 2014–2019
Lok Sabha members from Bihar
1982 births
Male actors from Bihar
Indian actor-politicians
India MPs 2019–present